Predrag Stevanović (born 3 March 1991) is a Serbian former professional footballer who played as an attacking midfielder. He is an older brother of Aleksandar Stevanović. In a career plagued by injuries Stevanović was kept out of action for over 1000 days between 2009 and 2014. He attended the Gesamtschule Berger Feld.

Career statistics

References

External links
 
 
 

1991 births
Living people
German people of Serbian descent
People educated at the Gesamtschule Berger Feld
Serbian footballers
Footballers from Essen
Association football midfielders
Serbia youth international footballers
Bundesliga players
3. Liga players
Regionalliga players
FC Schalke 04 II players
SV Werder Bremen players
SV Werder Bremen II players
Stuttgarter Kickers II players
SG Wattenscheid 09 players
Serbian expatriate footballers
Serbian expatriate sportspeople in Germany
Expatriate footballers in Germany